The first world record in the men's shot put was recognised by the International Association of Athletics Federations in 1912. That inaugural record was the 15.54 m performance by Ralph Rose in 1909.

As of June 21, 2009, 51 world records have been ratified by the IAAF in the event. The distances by these men were accomplished with a 16-pound shot.  The current world record was set in 2021, breaking a 1990 record after more than 31 years.  Rose's 1909 record lasted almost 19 years, and the record was untouched for almost a dozen years surrounding World War II.  The record was improved upon five times in 1960 and four times in 1934. The record set in 1990 held for over 31 years before it was broken with the current world record.

World record progression

See also 
 Women's shot put world record progression

References

Shot put, men
Shot put, men
Shot put
World record shot put